A cryotank or cryogenic tank is a tank that is used to store material at very low temperatures. 

The term "cryotank" refers to storage of super-cold fuels, such as liquid oxygen and liquid hydrogen. Cryotanks and cryogenics can be seen in many sci-fi movies, but they are still currently undeveloped. All that needs to be done is for a human to be loaded into the tank and then they can be frozen until a time comes when any diseases they have can be cured and they can live an even longer life. This could also be used in space travel and just preserving human life in general.  The problem with this is when the human body is frozen, ice crystals form in the cells. The ice crystals then continue to expand rupturing the cell wall and destroying the integrity of the cell, or killing it.

This means in order for humans to undergo the cryogenic process a way to significantly raise the levels of glucose produced in the human body is needed.

Material Uses 
Cryogenic tanks are used to store natural gases such as oxygen, argon, nitrogen, helium, hydrogen and other materials. Tanks can store the materials at the correct temperature and pressure for transportation.

In science fiction 

In science fiction, cryogenic tanks are used to freeze people. cry- is a Greek prefix which means "cold or freezing", hence humans are stored in the tank frozen until a future date.
Cryotanks are found in some science fiction films such as Demolition Man (1993), Prometheus (2012) and The Host (2013).

See also 
 Cryopreservation

References

External links 
 Michio Kaku - Why Cryogenics Is Bogus

Science fiction themes
Cryogenics